Taoga Niue is the main Government department to support and promote the use and preservation of the Niuean culture, language and tradition. Taoga Niue is the sixth pillar of the Niue Integrated Strategic Plan (NISP). Taoga Niue is now a Government Department with their main office at Paliati, Niue High School.

Niuean culture

See also 

 Tāoga Niue Museum

References